Christine Hunsicker is an entrepreneur and the CEO and Co-Founder of Gwynnie Bee, a retail industry online clothing subscription service that allows women to access an unlimited wardrobe. The company has shipped over 3 million boxes as of January 2016. Christine Hunsicker grew up in Pennsylvania. She attended Princeton University, where she played field hockey for the nationally ranked team and graduated with a Bachelor of Arts in 1999.

Career
In 2011, Hunsicker launched Gwynnie Bee, a subscription model clothing service. She focused first on sizes 10–32 after discovering that 80% of American women fall into this size range, most of whom are severely underserved by traditional retailers. Hunsicker utilized her experience with start-ups, algorithms, and other data-based methodologies to shape the company’s operations. Originally run out of her New York City apartment, Gwynnie Bee now operates from 5 offices in the USA and India and employs around 350 people. The company offers more than 150 rental brands and has shipped over 3 million rental boxes as of August 2016.
 
In October 2016, Hunsicker starred on Lifetime’s Project Runway: Fashion Startup, a spinoff of the successful reality TV series. Delving into the business side of the fashion industry, entrepreneurs pitched their startups to a panel of investors (including Hunsicker) for financial backing. Media coverage of the show included an appearance by Hunsicker on The Today Show.
 
In January 2018, Gwynnie Bee refashioned its service to be size inclusive.

Prior to Gwynnie Bee, Hunsicker was COO of Drop.io and President and COO of Right Media, two tech start-ups that were bought by Facebook and Yahoo!, respectively, the latter for $850 million.

Hunsicker has discussed her perspectives on the fashion industry, size inclusiveness, underserved markets, and the future of retail on various programs including Fox Business.

Awards and honors
Hunsicker has been honored with numerous achievements including Crain’s New York Business “40 Under 40”, INC.’s “The Most Impressive Women Entrepreneurs of 2016”, and Entrepreneur’s “25 Inspiring Entrepreneurs Under 40 Who Are Creating the Next Big Thing”. She has been credited with “disrupting” and “changing the fashion game”, “redesigning the plus-size clothing industry”, and “personalizing the plus-size fashion experience”.

References

External links
 Twitter page
 Gwynnie Bee
 Project Runway: Fashion Startup

Year of birth missing (living people)
American women chief executives
American retail chief executives
Living people
Princeton University alumni
21st-century American women